ICSB may refer to:
 International Committee on Systematic Bacteriology, former name of International Committee on Systematics of Prokaryotes, the body that oversees the nomenclature of prokaryotes
 International Conference on Systems Biology, the primary international conference for systems biology research, meeting annually since 2000
 International Christian School of Budapest, an international K-12 coeducational school in Diosd, Hungary, founded 1994

School:
 Immaculate Conception School for Boys, A Catholic Private School located in Malolos, Bulacan, Philippines